American studies or American civilization is an interdisciplinary field of scholarship that examines American literature, history, society, and culture. It traditionally incorporates literary criticism, historiography and critical theory.

Scholarship in American studies focuses on the United States. In the past decades, however, it has also broadened to include Atlantic history and interactions with countries across the globe. Subjects studied within the field are varied, but often examine the literary themes, histories of American communities, ideologies, or cultural productions. Examples might include topics in American social movements, literature, media, tourism, folklore, and intellectual history.

Fields studying specific American ethnic or racial groups are considered to be both independent of and included within the broader American studies discipline. This includes European American studies, African American studies, Latino studies, Asian American studies, American Indian studies, and others.

Founding notions
Vernon Louis Parrington is often cited as the founder of American studies for his three-volume Main Currents in American Thought, which combines the methodologies of literary criticism and historical research; it won the 1928 Pulitzer Prize. In the introduction to Main Currents in American Thought, Parrington described his field:

The "broad path" that Parrington describes formed a scholastic course of study for Henry Nash Smith, who received a PhD from Harvard's interdisciplinary program in history and American civilization in 1940, setting an academic precedent for present-day American studies programs.

The first signature methodology of American studies was the "myth and symbol" approach, developed in such foundational texts as Henry Nash Smith's Virgin Land in 1950 and Leo Marx's The Machine in the Garden in 1964. Myth and symbol scholars claimed to find certain recurring themes throughout American texts that served to illuminate a unique American culture. Later scholars such as Annette Kolodny and Alan Trachtenberg re-imagined the myth and symbol approach in light of multicultural studies.

Beginning in the 1960s and 1970s, these earlier approaches were criticized for continuing to promote the idea of American exceptionalism—the notion that the US has had a special mission and virtue that makes it unique among nations. Several generations of American studies scholars moved away from purely ethnocentric views, emphasizing transnational issues surrounding race, ethnicity, gender and sexuality, among other topics. But recent studies critique the exceptionalist nature of the transnational turn. "The transnational turn has positioned American Studies in a nationalist rut", observes Jeffrey Herlihy-Mera, in After American Studies: Rethinking the Legacies of Transnational Exceptionalism: 

Institutionally, in the last decade the American Studies Association has reflected the interdisciplinary nature of the field, creating strong connections to ethnic studies, gender studies, cultural studies and post- or de-colonial studies. Environmental perspectives, in ascendance in related fields, such as literature and history, have not penetrated the mainstream of American studies scholarship. A major theme of the field in recent years has been internationalization—the recognition that much vital scholarship about the US and its relations to the wider global community has been and is being produced outside the United States.

Debate on use of the term American
Until the mid-2000s, the use of American for this multidisciplinary field was widely defended. In 1998, Janice Radway argued, "Does the perpetuation of the particular name, American, in the title of the field... support the notion that such a whole exists even in the face of powerful work that tends to question its presumed coherence? Does the field need to be reconfigured conceptually?" She concluded, "the name American studies will have to be retained." In 2001, Wai Chee Dimmock argued that the field "is largely founded on this fateful adjective. [American] governs the domain of inquiry we construct, the range of questions we entertain, the kind of evidence we take as significant. The very professionalism of the field rests on the integrity and the legitimacy of this founding concept." In 2002, Heinz Ickstadt argued that American studies "should accept its name as its limitation and its boundary." In 2006, Dimmock affirmed that the field "does stand to be classified apart, as a nameable and adducible unit."

More recently, scholars have questioned American as a categorizing term. "In consideration of the limitations of conventional terms," Jeffrey Herlihy-Mera argued in 2018, instead of American, terms like "spaces claimed by the political body" and "residents of spaces claimed by the political body" would offer a "more sensitive and attuned description... of the regions, critical artifacts, communities, and individuals in question, one that is less charged with the ambiguities and colonial ties that weigh down the traditional disciplinary nomenclatures." In "the interests of justice and along the lines most suitable to our emergent age," argued Markha Valenta in 2017, scholars should consider "abandoning America as the field identifier."

Imperial American studies
"One of the central themes of American historiography," argued William Appleman Williams, "is that there is no American Empire"" Contesting such assertions has been a central part of the Imperial Turn in the field. Amy Kaplan maintained that "an imperial unconscious of national identity" lead to "overseas expansion, conquest, conflict, and resistance which have shaped the cultures of the United States." More recently, scholars have examined how cultural imperialism occurs within the US borders. Jeffrey Herlihy-Mera described the phenomenon as an attempt to transition the "cultural symbols of the invading communities from 'foreign' to 'natural,' 'domestic,'" through three discrete and sequential phases:
{| class="wikitable"
|People in new space
|Objective
|-
|(1) Merchants

Also termed "explorers" e.g., Lewis and Clark
|Encounter resources

E.g., minerals, trade routes, spices, furs, communities

to tax or conscript, fertile agricultural zones, strategic

geography, etc.
|-
|(2) Military

An invasion force
|Control resources

Implement martial law so that the metropolitan may

exploit resources; establish "Fort" cities, e.g., Fort

Lauderdale, Fort Worth etc. that facilitate metropolitan

settlement.
|-
|(3) Politicians

Socialize the space into a new province of the metropolitan
|Social engineering

Acculturize the space into a region of the metropolitan

through saturation of symbol, legend, and myth.

Establish laws and norms that promote the metropolitan

(invading system) as dominant culture and prohibit or

criminalize other systems; offer citizenship to conquered

peoples in exchange for submission to metropolitan

cultural norms and abandonment of original or other (in

the case of immigrants) social tendencies.
|}
(Herlihy-Mera, Jeffrey. 2018. After American Studies: Rethinking the Legacies of Transnational Exceptionalism. Routledge. p. 24)

While the third phase continues "in perpetuity," the imperial appropriation tends to be "gradual, contested (and continues to be contested), and is by nature incomplete." The Americanization of the continent has been described as a cultural engineering project that strives to "isolate residents within constructed spheres of symbols" such that they (eventually, in some cases after several generations) abandon other cultures and identify with the new symbols. "The broader intended outcome of these interventions might be described as a common recognition of possession of the land itself."

Outside the United States
Following the Second World War and during the Cold War, the US government promoted the study of the United States in several European countries, helping to endow chairs in universities and institutes in American history, politics and literature in the interests of cultural diplomacy. Many scholars and governments in Europe also recognized the need to study the US. The field has become especially prominent in Britain and Germany. The British Association for American Studies was founded in 1955, and is a constituent member of the European Association for American Studies.

European centers for American studies include the Center for American Studies in Brussels, Belgium, and most notably the John F. Kennedy-Institute for North American Studies in Berlin, Germany. Other centers for American studies in Germany include the Bavarian America-Academy, the University of Munich, the Heidelberg Center for American Studies (HCA) and the Center for North American Studies (Zentrum für Nordamerikaforschung or ZENAF) at Goethe University Frankfurt. Graduate studies in the field of North American studies can also be undertaken at the University of Cologne, which works together in joint partnership with the North American studies program at the University of Bonn. American Studies Leipzig at the University of Leipzig is a center for American studies on the territory of former East Germany. Founded in 1992, the Center for American Studies at the University of Southern Denmark now offers a graduate program in American studies. In the Netherlands the University of Groningen and the Radboud Universiteit Nijmegen offer a complete undergraduate and graduate program in American studies. The University of Amsterdam, the University of Leiden and the University of Utrecht only offer a graduate program in American studies. Both the University of Sussex and the University of Nottingham in England offer both a number of postgraduate and undergraduate programs. In Sweden, the Swedish Institute for North American Studies at Uppsala University offers a minor in American studies. In Slovakia, the University of Presov and Pavol Jozef Safarik University offer a complete undergraduate and graduate program in American studies combined with British studies. The Eccles Centre for American Studies at the British Library also offers a range of events and fellowships, as well as promoting the American collections held at the British Library.

Russia's main center for American studies is the Institute for US and Canadian Studies of the Russian Academy of Sciences, founded in 1967.

In the Middle East, the oldest American Studies program is the American Studies Center at the University of Bahrain in Sakhir. Founded in 1998, the UOB ASC celebrated its 10th anniversary in 2008. Established as a university minor, the ASC currently offers over 20 different courses for students, heralds weekly movies in its ASC Theater, regularly hosts diverse speakers, and sponsors gatherings and excursions for ASC students. There is a new American studies program at the University of Tehran, Iran. The new program, offered at the Faculty of World Studies, is a multidisciplinary MA program focusing on American culture, politics, history and ethnicity.

In Oceania, the University of Canterbury in Christchurch New Zealand operated a full undergraduate and graduate American studies program until 2012, and in Australia, a postgraduate program in US Studies is run by the United States Studies Centre at the University of Sydney.

In Canada, the University of Alberta has the Alberta Institute for American Studies. The University of Western Ontario has a Centre for American Studies that has both an undergraduate and master's program in American studies, with specializations at the graduate level in American Cultural Studies, and Canadian-American Relations. York University offers an undergraduate program in United States Studies.

In China, due to the lack of communication between China and the United States since the communist party took up the power in 1949, the Chinese recognition of the US was still limited to the communist political propaganda of the Cold War at the time when the two countries established the diplomatic relationship. Therefore, since the Sino-US relationship was normalized in 1979, various research centers have been founded within Chinese universities in order to meet up to the needs of understanding the US. Thus, most of the prestigious American studies centers in China established around 1980s, such as American Studies Center (Beijing Foreign Studies University) in 1979, the Institute of American Studies (Chinese Academy of Social Science) in 1981, Center for American Studies (Fudan University) in 1985, American Studies Center (Peking University) in 1980, Center for American Studies (Tongji University), American Studies Center (Sichuan University) in 1985, Johns Hopkins University-Nanjing University Center for Chinese and American Studies in 1986, American Social and Cultural Studies Center (China Foreign Affairs University) and Center for American Studies (East China Normal University) in 2004. These centers do not have undergraduate programs. Based on the requirement of the curriculum setup of the China Department of Education, these centers only have graduate programs. In addition, there are also scholarly journals, such as American Studies Quarterly, up in 1987 and organized by both the Institute of American Studies of Academy of Social Science and the Chinese Association of American Studies, Fudan American Review organized by the Center of American Studies of Fudan University.

American studies in the US is different from American studies in China. The former focuses more on one aspect, which is "civilization"; and the latter includes almost every aspects of the US, among which the civilization is just a constituent. Take the curriculum in the American Studies program in Beijing Foreign Studies University (BFSU) as an example. The American Studies program in BFSU is not only the oldest one but also the one in which all courses taught in English from the beginning of its founding. To help the students lay a comprehensive and interdisciplinary grounding in American Studies, the current ASC curriculum, made up of 28 courses, centers on three major areas: (1) American government and diplomacy, (2) American society and culture, and (3) American economy and trade. In addition, there have been short courses and seminars offered by guest speakers from home and abroad to broaden the students' horizon for better understanding of America. Every master student is required to choose one of the three major areas as his or her study track and chooses the courses accordingly.

The affiliation of each center decides its different research foci, although sometimes they have some study overlapping. According to the affiliations, these centers can be generally divided into two groups. The one, affiliated to the international relations department, academically tends to focus on US politics, economy, law and diplomacy. The diploma conferred is the politics. While the other, to the foreign language department, usually concentrate more on racial/gender issues, literature, religion, education, history and culture. The diploma conferred is English language and literature. For example, the American Studies Center of BFSU belongs to the School of English and International Studies, and the Center of American Studies of Fudan University is administered by the Institute of International Studies.

The researches on different areas are not equally developed. The researches on economy, politics and foreign policy have been much more developed than that on American culture and thoughts. Out of the all articles from the year of 1987 to 2008 published in American Studies Quarterly, the ones, which deal with the Sino-US relations including American foreign diplomacy, foreign commerce and military policies and strategies, accounts for 50.9 percent. Whereas, the articles, which have its topics on literature, history, gender, intellectual history, philosophy and culture, only take up about 20 percent. However, with the accelerating academic exchange between two countries, more and more students are coming to the US to study American studies and at the same time American studies scholars coming to China to do researches and teaching.

In the Republic of Korea, Sogang University (Seoul, Korea) is the sole institution that offers regular degree program both in bachelor (BA) and master (MA) degree in American studies, named American culture. The American culture division is run by the Department of English along with English literature and linguistics. The undergraduate program consists of classes covering topics such as Native American, Black American, Asian American, American history and the context of specific period of America. Keimyung University (Daegu, Korea), Hansung University (Seoul, Korea), Pyeongtaek University (Pyeongtaek, Gyeonggi-do, Korea), Kyunghee University (Yongin, Gyonggi-do, Korea) are also providing American studies major. Seoul National University (Seoul, Korea) and Yonsei University (Seoul, Korea) offers undergraduate interdisciplinary course about American studies. The American Studies Association of Korea (ASAK) researches multicultural context of American into Korean circumstance. In contrast to Chinese Institution focuses on America after Cold War era, the ASAK focuses on multicultural problem and politics that affects modern day American society.

International American Studies Association
Founded at Bellagio, Italy, in 2000, the International American Studies Association has held World Congresses at Leyden (2003), Ottawa (2005), Lisbon (2007), Beijing (2009), Rio de Janeiro (2011), The Sixth World Congress of IASA at Szczecin, Poland, August 3–6, 2013, and Alcalá de Henares, Madrid (2019). The IASA is the only worldwide, independent, non-governmental association for Americanists. Furthering the international exchange of ideas and information among scholars from all nations and various disciplines who study and teach America regionally, hemispherically, nationally, and transnationally, IASA is registered in the Netherlands as a non-profit, international, educational organization with members in more than forty countries around the world.

Associations and scholarly journals

The American Studies Association was founded in 1950. It publishes American Quarterly, which has been the primary outlet of American studies scholarship since 1949. The second-largest American studies journal, American Studies, is sponsored by the Mid-America American Studies Association and University of Kansas. Today there are 55 American studies journals in 25 countries.

See also
 American Literature (academic discipline)
 American Studies in Germany
 American studies in the United Kingdom
 Cultural studies
 High School of American Studies at Lehman College
 Outline of academic disciplines
 Public humanities

References

Further reading
Herlihy-Mera, Jeffrey. After American Studies: Rethinking the Legacies of Transnational Exceptionalism (Routledge; 2018)
 Bieger, Laura, Ramon Saldivar, and Johannes Voelz, eds. The Imaginary and Its Worlds: American Studies After the Transnational Turn (Dartmouth College Press/University Press of New England; 2013) 312 pp
 Kurian, George T. ed. Encyclopedia of American Studies (4 Vol. Groiler: 2001)
 Maddox, Lucy, ed. Locating American Studies: The Evolution of a Discipline (Johns Hopkins University Press 1998), 
Pease, Donald E. and Robyn Wiegman, eds. The Futures of American Studies (Duke University Press 2002), 
Lipsitz, George. American Studies in a Moment of Danger (University of Minnesota Press, 2001), 
''"American Studies at a Crossroads" https://web.archive.org/web/20120508024141/http://ragazine.cc/2011/12/discourse-american-studies/

External links
Encyclopedia of American Studies, Sophisticated short articles by experts.
International American Studies Association: IASA
RIAS Journal
AMERICANA – E-Journal of American Studies in Hungary
Journal of Transnational American Studies
The Futures Of American Studies Institute at Dartmouth College
American Studies Crossroads Project
British Association for American Studies
The American Studies Association
American Quarterly at Project MUSE
American Studies Journal
Theory and Method Resources, T. V. Reed, Washington State University
American Studies Journal
Mid-America American Studies Association
American Studies Association of Korea : ASAK
Southern American Studies Association

Library guides
 
 
 
 
 
 

 
Area studies